The Gambit is an album by drummer Shelly Manne's group Shelly Manne & His Men, recorded at sessions in 1957 and 1958 and released on the Contemporary label.

Reception

The Allmusic site rated the album 3 stars.

Track listing
All compositions by Charlie Mariano except as indicated
 "The Gambit: Queen's Pawn" - 4:41
 "The Gambit: En Passant" - 3:25
 "The Gambit: Castling" - 4:25
 "The Gambit: Checkmate" - 7:15 		
 "Blue Gnu" - 6:42
 "Tom Brown's Buddy" (Jim Hall) - 5:53
 "Hugo Hurwhey" (Russ Freeman) - 6:32 	  
Recorded at Contemporary's studio in Los Angeles on January 4, 1957 (track 1), July 17, 1957 (track 2), July 25, 1957 (tracks 3 & 4) and February 24, 1958 (tracks 5-7).

Personnel
Shelly Manne - drums
Stu Williamson - trumpet, valve trombone
Charlie Mariano - alto saxophone 
Russ Freeman - piano
Monty Budwig - bass

References

Contemporary Records albums
Shelly Manne albums
1958 albums